Isador Henry Coriat (December 10, 1875 – May 26, 1943) was an American psychiatrist and neurologist of Moroccan-Jewish descent. He was one of the first American psychoanalysts.

Biography
He was born in Philadelphia in 1875 as the son of Harry (Hyram) Coriat, a Moroccan Jew native of Marrakesh, who emigrated to the United States from France in 1867, and Clara née Einstein. He was of Moroccan Jewish descent on father's side and German on mother's side. He grew up in Boston and attended Tufts Medical School, graduating in 1900.

He was one of the founders of Boston Psychoanalytic Society, the first secretary in 1914 and president in years 1930–32. Coriat was the only Freudian analyst in Boston during the period after James Jackson Putnam's death.

Coriat worked with the Rev. Elwood Worcester, served as the medical expert for the Emmanuel Movement and co-authored Religion and Medicine; The Moral Control of Nervous Disorders.

Coriat married Etta Dann in 1910. He died on May 26, 1943, after a brief illness.

Selected works
 Abnormal Psychology. New York, Moffat, Yard, 1910
 The Hysteria of Lady Macbeth. New York, Moffat, Yard and company, 1912
 “The Oedipus-Complex in the Psychoneuroses,” The Journal of Abnormal Psychology, 7(3) (Aug.-Sept. 1912): 176-195.
 “Homosexuality, its Psychogenesis and Treatment,” New York Medical Journal (March 22, 1913).
 The Meaning of Dreams. Boston, Little, Brown, and company, 1915
 Repressed Emotions. New York, Brentano's 1920
 Religion and Medicine; The Moral Control of Nervous Disorders. By Elwood Worcester, Samual McComb [and] Isador M. Coriat. New York, Moffat, Yard & company, 1908
 Stammering, a Psychoanalytic Interpretation. N.Y. :  1928
 What is Psychoanalysis?   New York : Moffat, Yard & Co., 1917
 Sex and Hunger. Psychoanal Rev 8, 375-381 (1921) link
 The Sadism in Oscar Wilde's “Salome”. Psychoanal Rev 1, 257-259 (1914) link
 Humor and hypomania. Psychiatric Quarterly 13, 4, s. 681-688  (1939) 10.1007/BF01571533
 “The Structure of the Ego,” The Psychoanalytic Quarterly 9(3) (1940): 380–393.
 “Some Personal Reminiscences of Psychoanalysis in Boston: An Autobiographical Note,” The Psychoanalytic Review 32(1) (January 1945): 1–8.   
 “Obituary: Isador H. Coriat,” The Psychoanalytic Review''  30(4) (October 1943): 479–483.

References

External links
 Isador H. Coriat papers, 1869, 1883, 1887, 1892, 1899-1943 (inclusive). B MS c52. Harvard Medical Library, Francis A. Countway Library of Medicine, Boston, Mass.

American psychiatrists
1875 births
1943 deaths
American people of Moroccan descent
Physicians from Philadelphia
Tufts University School of Medicine alumni